Cable Bay 192N is an Indian reserve of the English River First Nation in Saskatchewan.

References

Indian reserves in Saskatchewan
Division No. 18, Saskatchewan